The FIS Nordic World Ski Championships 1930 took place between February 27 and March 1, 1930 in Oslo, Norway at the Holmenkollen.

Men's cross country

17 km 
February 28, 1930

50 km 
March 1, 1930

Men's Nordic combined

Individual 
February 27, 1930

Men's ski jumping

Individual large hill 
February 27, 1930

Medal table

References

FIS 1930 Cross country results
FIS 1930 Nordic combined results
FIS 1930 Ski jumping results
Results from German Wikipedia
Hansen, Hermann & Sveen, Knut. (1996) VM på ski '97. Alt om ski-VM 1925-1997 Trondheim: Adresseavisens Forlag. p. 42. . 

FIS Nordic World Ski Championships
Nordic Skiing
1930 in Nordic combined
Ski jumping competitions in Norway
1930 in Norwegian sport
1930 in ski jumping
Holmenkollen
February 1930 sports events
March 1930 sports events
Nordic skiing competitions in Norway
1930s in Oslo